= Weißenstein (Stammbach) =

Mountain in Germany

Coordinates: 50°07′48″N 11°41′25″E

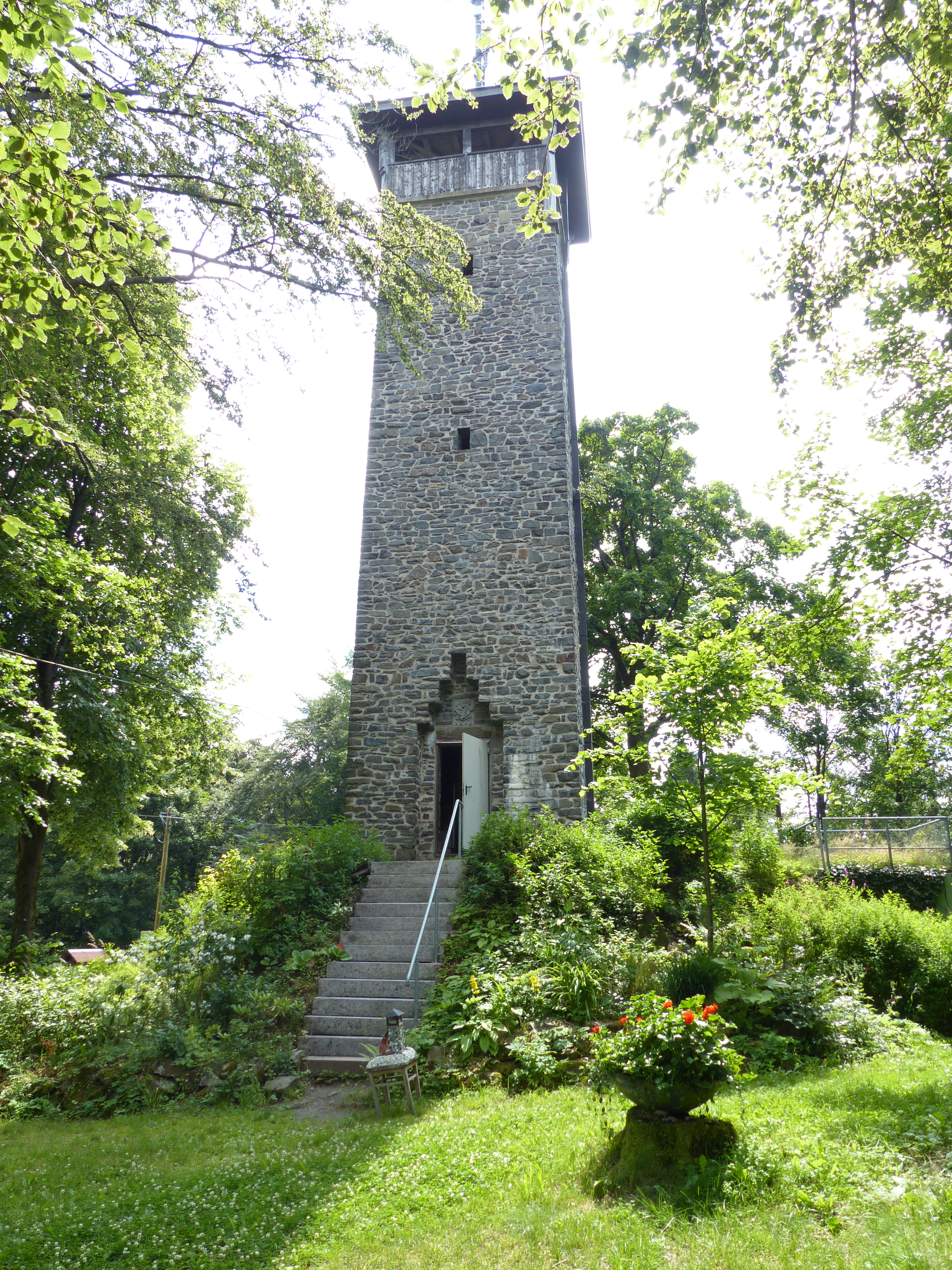
- View from the Weißenstein tower.

Highest point
- Elevation: 668 m (2,192 ft)

Geography
- Location: Bavaria, Germany

Weißenstein is a mountain of Bavaria, Germany.
